Cannings may refer to
 Cannings Foods Limited
The manor of Cannings in Bishops Cannings in Wiltshire